Steingrímur Jóhannesson (14 June 1973 – 1 March 2012) was an Icelandic international footballer who played as a striker. During a playing career spanning 17 years, he represented ÍBV, Fylkir, Selfoss and KFS. In total, he made 221 appearances in the Icelandic top flight, scoring 80 goals.  He was the competition's top goalscorer in the 1998 and 1999 seasons, scoring 16 and 12 goals respectively.

Steingrímur was selected to represent the Iceland national football team on one occasion, coming on as a substitute in the 1–1 draw with South Africa on 6 June 1998. He also made two appearances for the Iceland under-21 team.

Outside of football, Steingrímur worked as an electrician. He was married to Jóna Dís Kristjánsdóttir and the couple had two children, Kristjana María and Jóhanna Rún. Steingrímur died on 1 March 2012 in the Landspítali hospital in Reykjavík following a battle with cancer.

Honours
ÍBV
 Úrvalsdeild: 1997, 1998
 Bikarkeppni: 1998

Fylkir
 Bikarkeppni: 2001, 2002

References

1973 births
2012 deaths
Steingrimur Johannesson
Steingrimur Johannesson
Steingrimur Johannesson
Steingrimur Johannesson
Association football forwards
Steingrimur Johannesson
Deaths from cancer in Iceland